Jalal-e Sofla (also Romanized as Jalāl-e Soflá; also known as Jalāl-e Pā’īn, Jalāl, Jalār, Jelau, and Jelow) is a village in Kahshang Rural District, in the Central District of Birjand County, South Khorasan Province, Iran. At the 2006 census, its population was 12, in 6 families.

References 

Populated places in Birjand County